Qorvo is an American semiconductor company that designs, manufactures, and supplies radio-frequency systems for applications that drive wireless and broadband communications, as well as foundry services. The company, which trades on NASDAQ, was created by the merger of TriQuint Semiconductor and RF Micro Devices, which was announced in 2014 and completed on January 1, 2015. The headquarters for the company originally were in both Hillsboro, Oregon (home of TriQuint), and Greensboro, North Carolina (home of RFMD), but in mid-2016 the company began referring to its North Carolina site as its exclusive headquarters.

History
Qorvo was created on January 1, 2015, with the merger of TriQuint Semiconductor and RF Micro Devices (RFMD). In June 2015, the new company became a component of the S&P 500. At the time of joining the S&P 500, Qorvo was valued at $12 billion. The company employs more than 8,000 people. As of mid-2016, the Oregon plant alone was employing almost 1,000 people.

In 2016 GreenPeak Technologies was acquired, adding ultra-low power, short range wireless connected home and IoT to its portfolio. GreenPeak Technologies was best known for its Zigbee chips of which they had sold 100 million in 2015. GreenPeak Technologies is headquartered in Utrecht, The Netherlands. 

In 2019, Qorvo acquired Active-Semi International, a fabless company with expertise in power efficiency and power management, which have become critical skills for designing circuitry for 5G equipment, the Internet of things (IoT), and a rapidly growing list of other products.

In 2020, Qorvo acquired Irish semi-conductor company Decawave in a deal that was estimated to be worth $400 million. 

In 2021, Qorvo announced the acquisition of Mountain View, California-based NextInput, a pioneer in the emerging field of force-sensing for human-machine interface (HMI). On November 3, 2021, Qorvo announced the acquisition of Princeton, New Jersey-based UnitedSiC, a leading manufacturer of silicon carbide semiconductors.

References

External links 

Companies listed on the Nasdaq
Semiconductor companies of the United States
2015 establishments in Oregon
Companies based in Greensboro, North Carolina
American companies established in 2015
Electronics companies established in 2015